The white-tailed cisticola (Cisticola anderseni) is a species of bird in the family Cisticolidae. It is found in Tanzania.

It was first recognised as a new species by Éric Burnier in the 1980s. He brought this to the attention of Neil and Liz Baker, who soon confirmed the identity of this species as new. It has been formally described in 2021.

References

White-tailed cisticola
Endemic birds of Tanzania
White-tailed cisticola